Maryam Jameelah (May 23, 1931 – October 31, 2012) was an American-Pakistani author of over thirty books on Islamic culture and history and a female voice for conservative Islam, known for her writings about the West. Born Margret Marcus in New York City to a non-observant Jewish family, she explored Judaism and other faiths during her teens before converting to Islam in 1961 and emigrating to Pakistan. She was married to and had five children with Muhammad Yusuf Khan, a leader in the Jamaat-e-Islami political party, and resided in the city of Lahore.

Biography
Jameelah was born Margret Marcus in New Rochelle, New York, to parents of German Jewish descent, and spent her early years in Westchester. As a child, Marcus was psychologically and socially ill at ease with her surroundings, and her mother described her as bright, exceptionally bright, but also "very nervous, sensitive, high-strung, and demanding". Even while in school she was attracted to Asian and particularly Arab culture and history, and counter to the support for Israel among people around her, she generally sympathised with the plight of Arabs and Palestinians. Another source describes her interests as zigzagging from Holocaust photographs, to "Palestinian suffering, then a Zionist youth group and, ultimately, fundamentalist Islam."

She entered the University of Rochester after high-school, but had to withdraw before classes began because of psychiatric problems. In Spring, 1953, she entered New York University. There she explored Reform Judaism, Orthodox Judaism, Ethical Culture and the Baháʼí Faith, but found them unsatisfactory, especially in their support for Zionism. In the summer of 1953, she had another nervous breakdown and fell into despair and exhaustion. It was during this period that she returned to her study of Islam and read the Quran. She was also inspired by Muhammad Asad's The Road to Mecca, which recounted his journey and eventual conversion from Judaism to Islam. At NYU she took a course on Judaism's influence on Islam which was taught by Rabbi and scholar Abraham Katsch, which ironically strengthened her attraction to Islam. However Marcus's health grew worse and she dropped out of the university in 1956 before graduation; from 1957 to 59 she was hospitalized for schizophrenia.

Returning home to White Plains in 1959, Marcus involved herself with various Islamic organizations, and began corresponding with Muslim leaders outside America, particularly Maulana Abul Ala Maududi, a leader of Jamaat-e-Islami (Islamic Society) in Pakistan. Finally, on May 24, 1961, she converted to Islam and adopted the name Maryam Jameelah. After accepting Mawlana Maududi's invitation she emigrated to Pakistan in 1962, where she initially resided with him and his family. In 1963, she married Muhammad Yusuf Khan, a member of Jamaat-e-Islami, becoming his second wife. She had five children: two boys and three girls (the first of whom died in infancy). Jameelah regards these years (1962–64) to be the formative period of her life during which she matured and began her life's work as a Muslim defender of conservative Islam.

Writings
Jameelah started writing her first novel, Ahmad Khalil: The Story of a Palestinian Refugee and His Family at the age of twelve; she illustrated her book with pencil sketches and color drawings. She also studied drawing in Fall 1952 at Art Students League of New York, and exhibited her work at Baháʼí Center's Caravan of East and West art gallery. On her emigration to Pakistan she was told that drawings of animals and humans was un-Islamic by Maududi, and abandoned it in favor of writing. Her writings are supplemented by a number of audio and video tapes.

She was deeply critical of secularism, materialism and modernization, both in Western society, as well as in Islam. She regarded traditions such as veiling, polygamy, and gender segregation (purdah) to be ordained by the Quran and by the words of Muhammad, and considered movements to change these customs to be a betrayal of Islamic teachings. Jameelah's books and articles have been translated into several languages including Urdu, Persian, Turkish, Bengali and Indonesian. Her correspondence, manuscripts, bibliographies, chronologies, speeches, questionnaires, published articles, photographs, videocassettes, and artwork are included in the Humanities and Social Sciences Library collection of the New York Public Library.  Jameelah's life is the subject of a book by the biographer Deborah Baker.

Bibliography
Books by Jameelah
A great Islamic movement in Turkey: Badee-u-Zaman Said Nursi
A manifesto of the Islamic movement
A select bibliography of Islamic books in English
Ahmad Khalil: the biography of a Palestinian Arab refugee
At home in Pakistan (1962-1989) : the tale of an American expatriate in her adopted country
Correspondence between Abi-l-A'La Al-Maudoodi and Maryam Jameelah
Islam and Modernism
Islam and orientalism
Islam and the Muslim woman today
Islam and our social habits : Islamic manners versus Western etiquette
Islam and modern man : the prospects for an Islamic renaissance, the call of Islam to modern man
Islam versus Ahl al-Kitab: past and present
Islam versus the West
Islamic culture in theory and practice
Islam face to face with the current crisis
Is Western civilization universal?
Memoirs of childhood and youth in America (1945-1962) : the story of one Western convert's quest for truth
Modern technology and the dehumanization of man 
Shaikh Hassan alBanna & al Ikhwan al-Muslimun
Shaikh Izz-ud-Din Al-Qassam Shaheed : a great Palestinian mujahid, (1882-1935) : his life and work
Shehu Uthman dan Fodio, a great mujaddid of West Africa
The Generation Gap - Its Causes and Consequences
The Holy Prophet and his impact on my life
The resurgence of Islam and our liberation from the colonial yoke
Three Great Islamic Movements in the Arab World of the Recent Past
Two great Mujahadin of the recent past and their struggle for freedom against foreign rule : Sayyid Ahmad Shahid; Imam Shamil: a great Mujahid of Russia 
Westernization and Human Welfare
Western civilization condemned by itself; a comprehensive study of moral retrogression and its consequences
Western imperialism menaces Muslims
Why I embraced Islam

Biography
 The Convert: A Tale of Exile and Extremism, Deborah Baker, Macmillan, 2011.

References

Sources

External links
 http://www.jannah.org/sisters/jameelah.html

1934 births
2012 deaths
American emigrants to Pakistan
Converts to Islam
American Muslims
American people of German-Jewish descent
Jamaat-e-Islami Pakistan politicians
Jewish American writers
New York University alumni
Pakistani people of American-Jewish descent
Pakistani people of German-Jewish descent
Pakistani Sunni Muslim scholars of Islam
Writers from New Rochelle, New York
People with schizophrenia
Writers from Lahore